Albert Day (7 March 1918 – 21 January 1983) was a professional footballer. He was born in Camberwell.

During his career he played as a centre forward for Watford and Ipswich Town for whom he was top scorer in their 1946–47 season.

References

1918 births
1983 deaths
Footballers from Camberwell
English footballers
Association football forwards
Hastings United F.C. players
Brighton & Hove Albion F.C. players
Ipswich Town F.C. players
Watford F.C. players
English Football League players